F-1 World Grand Prix II is a Formula One racing game for the Nintendo 64, Sega Dreamcast and Game Boy Color. The Nintendo 64 version was released only in Europe in 1999, with other formats following in 2000. The game is a sequel to F-1 World Grand Prix, and is based on the 1998 Formula One season (Nintendo 64 version) and the 1999 Formula One season (Game Boy Color and Dreamcast versions).

Reception

IGN gave the Dreamcast version a 7.1 out of 10 overall praising the presentation of the game but criticised the graphics. N64 Magazine damned it as too similar to the previous game, giving it 72%.

Sequel 
A successor, F-1 World Grand Prix III, was in development and would have been based on the 1999 or 2000 season, but was never released.

F1 World Grand Prix 2000, published by Eidos Interactive (with Video System also credited in the game's box art) and developed by Eutechnyx, was released on March 8, 2001 for the PlayStation and PC.

References

1999 video games
Dreamcast games
Formula One video games
Game Boy Color games
Konami games
Nintendo 64 games
Video game sequels
Video games developed in the United States
Video System games
Paradigm Entertainment games
Multiplayer and single-player video games